Dizzy Dames is a 1935 American musical film directed by William Nigh and written by George Waggner. The film stars Marjorie Rambeau, Florine McKinney, Lawrence Gray, Inez Courtney, Berton Churchill and Fuzzy Knight. The film was released on May 29, 1935, by Liberty Pictures.

Plot

Cast          
Marjorie Rambeau as Lillian Bennett / Lillian Marlowe
Florine McKinney as Helen Bennett
Lawrence Gray as Terry Ramsey
Inez Courtney as Arlette
Berton Churchill as Dad Hackett
Fuzzy Knight as Buzz
Kitty Kelly as La Vere
Lillian Miles as Gloria Weston
John Warburton as Rodney Stokes
Mary Forbes as Mrs. Stokes

References

External links
 

1935 films
American musical films
1935 musical films
Films directed by William Nigh
American black-and-white films
1930s English-language films
1930s American films